Sadia Bashir (Punjabi) is a Pakistani computer scientist, game developer and entrepreneur. She is the foundress and CEO of PixelArt Games Academy, the first game training academy in Pakistan. Sadia is also the first Pakistani to represent at the Game Developer's Conference.

Personal life 
Sadia was born in a family where education for females was not a priority. However, Sadia wanted to study at an English medium school and she started working to fund her education. She used to give home tuition to children and also used to stitch clothes to fund her educational expenses.

When Sadia joined her new school, she was unable to adjust in because of her different family background. In her school, Sadia started spending time at the library where she learned more about graphics, computers and gaming. Sadia developed an interest in gaming when she used to play video games with her brother's friends. She started designing her own games when she was 13. Sadia had to continue working to fund her education for her university. She holds a bachelor’s degree in computer science. She also holds a Masters in Computer Science with Artificial intelligence and Software Engineering, Production processes for Video Games from COMSATS university.

Career 
Sadia worked as a programmer for a few years before switched to developing games. Her mentor decided to fund Sadia and her colleague to work on games and they started work in a small basement. Sadia worked for seven years in the gaming industry. During her work, she was disappointed with the lack of innovation and less role of women in the gaming industry in Pakistan and so she decided to start an initiative that addressed the problem. Sadia arranged meetups and conferences where she connected local developers with international developers. She also organized workshops at universities. After seeing a positive response for the work, Sadia decided to create PixelArt Games Academy. Her organization now has game developers Ken Levine (founder of Ghost story games, creative director BioShock), Rami Ismail (co-founder Vlambeer), Brie Code (founder Tru Luv Media), and Jonathon Chey (co-founder of former Irrational Games) on the advisory board. They provide mentorship to Pakistani developers.

Sadia's gaming academy provides trainings and research and development in games to students and developers in Pakistan. Her organization is also addressing the gender gap in the gaming industry. Sadia's program has a criterion of at least 33% women in the workplace. Her academy also offers scholarships to women. Sadia aims to bridge the gender gap in the tech industry through her initiative.

Achievements 
Sadia was awarded the “Women Can Do” Award from US Embassy at the Women Entrepreneurs Summit in 2016 for her accomplishments. The award is for the recognition of successful women entrepreneurs of Pakistan. She was in the winning team of global entrepreneurship summit 2017. She was also the first speaker from Pakistan to speak at Game Developer’s Conference, 2017 in San Francisco. Sadia is also a member of the Prime Minister's Youth Council, an initiative by the Prime Minister of Pakistan, Imran Khan. In 2018, she was featured in Forbes 30 under 30 Asia in the enterprise technology category. The same year, she was named as a Global Gaming Citizen by Facebook Gaming at The Game Awards, held in Los Angeles.

References 

Living people
Pakistani computer businesspeople
Pakistani women computer scientists
Pakistani computer programmers
Year of birth missing (living people)